John Noble was Dean of Exeter between 1274 and 1280.

Notes

Deans of Exeter
13th-century English people